Beyond Religion: Ethics for a Whole World is a 2011 book by 14th Dalai Lama. It is about Secular ethics use in our everyday life. Those are ethics that can be used by both religious and non-religious people. There are many suggestions about getting rid of destructive emotions and helping other people. In this book there is justified the importance of compassion.

References 

Books by the 14th Dalai Lama
Philosophical literature
2011 non-fiction books
Ethics books
Houghton Mifflin books